Vaya is a rural locality (a settlement) and the administrative center of Vayskoye Rural Settlement, Krasnovishersky District, Perm Krai, Russia. The population was 393 as of 2010. There are 8 streets.

Geography 
Vaya is located 101 km northeast of Krasnovishersk (the district's administrative centre) by road. Ust-Uls is the nearest rural locality.

References 

Rural localities in Krasnovishersky District